Kenneth S. Kantzer (March 29, 1917 – June 20, 2002) was an American theologian and educator in the evangelical Christian tradition.

Life and career
He was born Detroit, Michigan, United States. 

Kantzer, having studied at Faith Theological Seminary, Trinity Seminary and Bible College, and earned a Ph.D. in Philosophy and Religion from Harvard University (1950), was a professor of biblical and systematic theology and academic dean of Trinity Evangelical Divinity School (TEDS) from 1960 to 1978. There he helped to grow TEDS from a small denominational seminary to a major evangelical Christian graduate school with a national and international reputation. 

In 1968 he also served as president of the Evangelical Theological Society. From 1977 to 1982, he was editor of Christianity Today, and, from 1982 to 1984, was president of Trinity College in Deerfield, Illinois. He later returned to Trinity Evangelical Divinity School, and helped found its Ph.D. program.

Kantzer was known as a defender of the doctrine of biblical inerrancy, attempting to articulate this doctrine in such a way as to avoid the rigidity of fundamentalist Christianity while answering the objections of Christian liberalism. 

Through his teaching and his leadership at TEDS and his work at Christianity Today, Kantzer made a significant contribution to the growth of evangelicalism for more than forty years.

He died in 2002, Victoria, Canada.

Works

Books

Articles and chapters

 - this chapter is an edited reprint of a chapter entitled "Evangelicals and the Inerrancy Question" - 1979
Kenneth S. Kantzer[ Kenneth Kantzer, "Evangelicals and Inerrancy"] edited reprint of a chapter entitled "" in Evangelical Roots

Festschrift

References

Further reading
 Influential Teacher and Leader Kenneth Kantzer Dies - Christianity Today Magazine.
 The Legacy of Kenneth Kantzer

1917 births
2002 deaths
20th-century American male writers
20th-century American theologians
20th-century evangelicals
21st-century American male writers
21st-century American theologians
21st-century evangelicals
American evangelicals
American magazine editors
American religious writers
Evangelical theologians
Evangelical writers
Faith Theological Seminary alumni
Harvard Divinity School alumni
Trinity International University faculty
Place of birth missing
Place of death missing